The women's 100 metre freestyle S10 competition at the 2013 Mediterranean Games was held on 23 June 2018 at the Mersin Olympic Swimming Pool.

Schedule 
All times are Eastern European Summer Time (UTC+03:00)

Records

Results

References 

Women's 100 metre freestyle S10